Music from the Motion Picture: The Adventures of Tintin: The Secret of the Unicorn is the soundtrack for the 2011 computer-animated action/adventure film The Adventures of Tintin directed and produced by Steven Spielberg, based on Belgian cartoonist Hergé's comic book series of the same name. The film score is composed by John Williams, which is the first time he had composed the score of a film since Indiana Jones and the Kingdom of the Crystal Skull (2008)  as well as his first score for an animated film. The score was released on 21 October 2011 by Sony Classical Records. Williams received a nomination for Best Original Score at the 84th Academy Awards for his work in the film.

Production 
Most of the score was written while the animation was still in the early stages, with Williams seeking to employ "the old Disney technique of doing music first and have the animators trying to follow what the music is doing". Eventually, several cues had to be revised during the editing of the film, when the editor Michael Kahn shown the rough cut. The composer decided to employ various musical styles, with "1920s30s European jazz" for the opening credits and "pirate music" for the battle at sea.

Track 13, "Presenting Biance Castafiore," quotes music from The Barber of Seville, specifically the aria "Una voce poco fa."

Track list

Accolades

Reception 
James Christopher Monger of AllMusic stated that, "Williams does not exaggerate the effects for comic purposes as he does, for example, in his Indiana Jones scores. Rather, this is ear candy for a movie that is equally sweet." Author Brad Kamminga wrote: "John Williams score for The Adventures of Tintin lacks the glorious and splendorous themes that defined many of Williams famous scores. Aside from that The Adventures of Tintin is an excellent score. John Williams, in his old age, proves once again that he has not lost his touch and remains to be  a truly unrivaled composer [...] If you are a huge fan of John Williams and his complex works, this is definitely a score you need to purchase, but if you only enjoy the brilliant main theme songs Williams has composed in the past, don’t expect to hear them in this score."

Filmtracks.com wrote "if there is no substitute for John Williams' intellectual superiority over his peers, for even when approaching 80 years old, his comedic adventure techniques dazzle you with complexities of structure and instrumentation not heard elsewhere". Writing for the Limelight (magazine), Francis Merson summarised the review as "John Williams takes on a cartoon legend". Soundtrack Geek-based Jorn Tilnes wrote "John Williams is well and truly back ladies and gentlemen and you can really hear it in the score how terrific a composer he is. It's so full of energy, adventure and action and is perhaps only let down by a slight inconsistency. It doesn't sound like vintage John Williams from start to finish, but there are a lot of fun to be had and although the themes aren't as good as Williams absolute best, they represents Tintin well and some of them are easily remembered.

In the review for Static Mass Emporium, Phil Blanckley summarised "The rhythmic flow of the score keeps you gripped throughout, and although it may not tug at the heartstrings as much as Williams' previous compositions, it does what it is intended to do  create the feeling of adventure. At times, it does seem like a never-ending frenzy of a musical mayhem, but it his John williams' at his best."

References

External links 

 
  (archived)

2011 soundtrack albums
2010s film soundtrack albums
John Williams soundtracks
Adventure film soundtracks
Animated film soundtracks
Sony Classical Records soundtracks
Instrumental soundtracks
Film scores